Rubén Piñeda (born 11 April 1974) is a Salvadoran swimmer. He competed in the men's 100 metre butterfly event at the 1996 Summer Olympics.

References

1974 births
Living people
Salvadoran male swimmers
Olympic swimmers of El Salvador
Swimmers at the 1996 Summer Olympics
Place of birth missing (living people)